The 2nd Mechanized Brigade of general Rudolf Viest is a subordinate component of the Ground Forces of the Slovak Republic. The headquarters of the 2nd Mechanized Brigade is located in Prešov.

Main task 
The main task of the 2nd Mechanized Brigade is to "participate in the tasks of defense and protection of vital interests of Slovak republic and its allies against military and non-military threats by conducting military and non-military operations. With regard to organizational structure and armament, the 2nd MechBde is designed to fulfill full spectrum operations against lightly armored enemy units in high battle rhythm."

History

Commanders

Organizational structure 
 HQ of the 2nd Mechanized Brigade (Prešov)
 21st Mixed Mechanized Battalion (Trebišov)
  (Michalovce)
 Self-propelled artillery section (Michalovce)
 Battalion logistics support (Prešov)
 CIMIC and PSYOPS unit (Martin)
 Directly subordinate units

Equipment and weapon systems 
Small arms and portable artillery
 Pistol CZ 82 
 Model 58 assault rifle  
 Universal machine gun model 59  
 Sniper rifle SVDN 1	  
 Sniper rifle AW-50  
 Rocket-propelled grenade RPG-7	  
 OZ 9P135 M anti-tank missile launcher 	  
 Mortar 81mm  
 Mortar 82mm  
 Mortar 98mm

Armoured fighting vehicles
 BVP/1 infantry fighting vehicle (Czechoslovak and Slovak variants)	 
 OT-90 infantry fighting vehicle (Czechoslovak and Slovak BMP variant) with 9M113 Konkurs anti-tank missile system	 
 T-72M1 main battle tank	

Artillery vehicles
 Self-propelled gun howitzer ZUZANA

Utility and transport vehicles
 Off-road vehicle Land Rover Defender 110 (utility and patrol vehicle)  
 Mercedes-Benz G-Class (utility and patrol vehicle)
 Off-road vehicle UAZ-469 B (utility and patrol vehicle, gradually decommissioned)	  
 Mercedes-Benz G-300 (military ambulance)
 Volkswagen Transporter (T4) (military ambulance)
 AKTIS 4x4 off-road transport vehicle (military transport truck)
 Tatra T-815 VVN heavy off-road transport (military transport truck)
 Tatra T-815-7 heavy off-road transport (military transport truck)  
 Tatrapan T1 ZASA armoured personnel carrier / armoured truck (transport, logistics)
 Praga V3S off-road transport vehicle (military transport truck, gradually decommissioned)	

Engineering and specialist vehicles
 Tatra T-815 Multilift container loader  
 Crane vehicle AV-15 
 Bridgelayer vehicles
 Božena 3 mine flail and de-mining equipment

Reconnaissance drone
 Innocon Microfalcon UAV

Portable radiolocator
 FLIR Ranger R20

Insignia
The insignia of the 2nd mechanized Brigade and its individual battalions includes coat of arms style emblems for each of the major components. The 2nd Mechanized Brigade also has an honorary battle flag.

See also
1st Mechanized Brigade of the Slovak Ground Forces

References

Further reading 
Štaigl, J. a kolektív: Generáli - slovenská vojenská generalita 1918 – 2009 ("Generals: Slovak Military Generals 1918 - 2009"), Magnet Press, Slovakia 2009, str. 68

External links 
 Armed Forces of the Slovak Republic
 General Staff of the Slovak Armed Forces
 Ground Forces HQ
 2nd Mechanized Brigade
 21st mixed Mechanized Battalion
 22nd Mechanized Battalion of general Mikuláš Markuš
 Self-propelled Artillery Section
 Logistics Support Battalion

Military units and formations of Slovakia
Prešov